Tetsuo Araki (1937–1984) was a 20th-century Japanese print artist. He worked mostly with aquatints and etchings. Original prints are sold at around US$500. He was born in Tokyo, Japan where he studied at the Musashino Art University. Eventually, he moved to a studio in Paris to continue his work.

Works
A few known Araki prints are:
Composition, 1960
Le Reve D'hiver, 1971
Untitled II, 1962

References

External links
Tetsuo Araki-Oxford Reference
Araki Prints and Biographical Information

20th-century Japanese artists
1937 births
1984 deaths